Shaltuk (also Romanized as Shāltūk; also known as Shālkūh) is a village in Sardar-e Jangal Rural District, Sardar-e Jangal District, Fuman County, Gilan Province, Iran. At the 2006 census, its population was 167, in 43 families.

References 

Populated places in Fuman County